Catocala seiohbo is a moth of the family Erebidae first described by Katsumi Ishizuka in 2002. It is found in the Chinese provinces of Sichuan, Guangxi, Guangdong and Hunan.

The wingspan is about 67 mm.

References

External links
"Catocala seiohbo Ishizuka, 2002 ドウキョウキシタバ". Digital Moths of Asia. Retrieved October 20, 2019.

Moths described in 2002
seiohbo
Moths of Asia